Moroccan Canadians are Canadians of full or partial Moroccan descent, as well as people from the state of Morocco who are ethno-linguistic and religious minorities. According to the 2011 Census, there were 71,910 Canadians who claimed full or partial Moroccan ancestry, an increase compared to the 2006 Census. A large minority of Moroccan Canadians, comprising 27,000 people, are Moroccan Jews.

History
Moroccans began arriving in Canada in the mid-1960s in search of employment and a new life. Between 1962 and 1993, 40,000 settled in Canada.

The next wave came in the late 1990s. Moroccan immigrants settled mainly in the province of Quebec, but there are also communities in Toronto, Vancouver, Ottawa and Winnipeg. Because many Moroccans living in Canada are not registered with the Moroccan authorities, the real weight of the Moroccan community in Canada may be underestimated.

In recent years, Moroccans have become more organized, as have other communities in Canada, and are starting to form communities across the country. There are at least 20 Moroccan organizations in Canada.

At the 2001 Canadian Census there were 21,355 Canadians who indicated Moroccan descent, with over 16,000, about 75% of the total population, residing in Montreal.

Notable people
 Aldo Bensadoun, is a Canadian businessman, investor and philanthropist. He is the founder and executive chairman of the Aldo Group, a worldwide retail shoe company.
 Gad Elmaleh, is a Moroccan Canadian stand-up comedian actor and artist.
 Fatima Houda-Pepin is a Canadian Quebec politician and a former member of the National Assembly of Quebec, Canada. 
 Hicham Bennir is a Canadian and Moroccan film director, cinematographer, editor, producer, writer and photographer. He was the winner of the world photo contest in 2009 and 2010. 
 Rachid Badouri, comedian.
 Yassine Bounou, footballer.
 Soufiane Chakkouche, writer and journalist
 Emmanuelle Chriqui, actress (Entourage, You Don't Mess with the Zohan).
 A-Trak , is a Canadian DJ, turntablist, record producer.
 Nadia Essadiqi, actress and singer.
 Adam Lamhamedi, Moroccan Canadian alpine skier; competed for Morocco at the 2014 Winter Olympics.
 Vaï, Moroccan-French Canadian rapper.
 Nora Fatehi, Bollywood actress and dancer.
 Imane Anys, better known as Pokimane, is a Twitch streamer and YouTuber.
 Faouzia, Moroccan Canadian singer.
 Hicham Nostik, Moroccan writer, YouTuber and podcaster.

See also

Algerian Canadians
Tunisian Canadians
Middle Eastern Canadians
Canada-Morocco relations
Arab Canadians
Berbers in Canada

References

External links
Moroccan In Canada
Moroccan Community In Vancouver

 

Ethnic groups in Canada
Arab Canadian
Moroccan emigrants to Canada
Arab diaspora in North America
 
African Canadian